Norma Therese Falby (May 10, 1917 – September 19, 2006) — pen name Norma Lorre Goodrich — was an American professor of French, comparative literature and writing who taught in the University of Southern California and Claremont Colleges for 45 years and published several popular books on Arthuriana.

Goodrich was noted for her thesis, first presented in a 1986 book titled King Arthur, that the legendary monarch was not a myth, but a real person, who lived not in England or Wales, as conventionally understood, but in Scotland. In her interpretation, Queen Guinevere was a Pictish queen, and Sir Lancelot a Scottish king. Her scholarly methodology involved back-translating Latin place names found in Geoffrey of Monmouth’s Historia Regum Britanniae  to what she believed to be their Celtic originals. Her findings have not been accepted by Galfridian scholars.

Biography

Youth and education
Goodrich was born May 10, 1917, in Huntington, Vermont, the daughter of Charles Edmund and Edyth Annie (Riggs) Falby. When she was 5, an aunt gave her a copy of Alfred, Lord Tennyson’s book The Idylls of the King, and set her on a literary path. Goodrich graduated from the University of Vermont in 1938 with a bachelor’s degree and continued her studies at universities in France, where she lived for many years and once owned and directed a school.

Career
She married Joseph Lorre and the couple had a son, Jean-Joseph Lorre, but they divorced in 1946. At the age of nearly 50 she earned doctoral degrees in French and Roman philology from Columbia University in 1965. The previous year, she had remarried, to John Hereford Howard, and began teaching French and comparative literature at the University of Southern California rising ultimately to an assistant professorship. In 1971, after an associate professorship, she became dean of the faculty at Scripps College, a women’s college in Claremont and one of the five undergraduate Claremont Colleges. After retirement, she became a professor emerita.

Popular writings
Using the pen name “Norma Lorre Goodrich”, she began publishing books for a popular audience in 1960, beginning with “Myths of the Hero,” an exploration of myths from ancient and medieval times. In it she wrote, “The hero myth may be the one that has most influenced culture down the centuries.”
By 1986, now professor emerita at the Claremont Colleges, she had turned her attention full-time to the legend of King Arthur. That year she told a Los Angeles Times reporter that she had discovered a void in Arthurian scholarship: “All the books on Arthur have been on the mythology, the legend,” but not the history. (Of course, this was not true; many books had already investigated the “historical Arthur”.) Goodrich traveled extensively in Britain and France and laid claim to having mastered several ancient and modern languages. She and her husband traveled to Scotland and followed routes laid out by ancient maps, unearthing clues to the historical King Arthur. She adopted the view that the 12th century pseudo-historian, Geoffrey of Monmouth had known that Arthur had not been in England, but in Scotland, but had concealed this unpopular view by listing the names of Arthur's battles in Latin rather than Gaelic—the original Celtic language of Scotland. “When I finally figured out what he was doing, I translated the Latin back into Gaelic,” Goodrich told the Riverside Press-Enterprise in 1994. She then found that the names coincided with places in Scotland. (The conventional view has always been that Geoffrey was describing places in southwestern England or Wales.) From her analyses of ancient languages, Goodrich discerned that Guinevere was a Pictish queen and Lancelot a Scottish king.

Goodrich's books were infrequently reviewed in scholarly journals and generally ignored by academic authorities. (For example, neither Norris J. Lacy's The New Arthurian Encyclopedia (1996) nor Alan Lupack's The Oxford Guide to Arthurian Literature and Legend (2005), both of which are exhaustive, mention her works in their vast indexes.) One exception was Rosemary Morris's review of King Arthur in the journal Albion. Morris was scathing. She found Goodrich's work to be

Final years

Her husband John died in February 1995 at the age of 77. Goodrich died on September 19, 2006 of natural causes at her home in Claremont, California. Her obituary in the Los Angeles Times stated that "the fact that her King Arthur findings contradicted those of other scholars did not trouble Goodrich".

Works
Myths of the Hero (1960)
The Ancient Myths (1960; PB: Mentor, New American Library)
Medieval Myths
 Revised/expanded edition (1977)
Le Morte D'Arthur, Abridged and introduced By Norma Lorre Goodrich (1963; Washington Square Press)
Charles, Duke of Orleans: Poet and Prince (1963; Macmillan Company)
The Ways of Love: Eleven Romances of Medieval France (1965; George Allen & Unwin)
Charles of Orleans: A Study of His French and His English Poetry (1967; Geneva: Libraire Droz)
Giono: Master of Fictional Modes (1973; Princeton University Press)
King Arthur (1986)
Priestesses (1989)
Merlin (1987; PB 1989: HarperPerennial)
Guinevere (1992, Franklin Watts; PB: HarperPerennial)
The Holy Grail (1992, HarperCollins)
Heroines: Demigoddess, Prima Donna, Movie Star (1994)
The Doctor and Maria Theresa
Charlemagne
The Jungle of Academe: The Poetry of Norma Lorre Goodrich (2013; Compiled by Andrew Whitenack)

Accolades
Dame, Knights Templar, Commandery of Nova Scotia, Scotland
Member of the Metropolitan Opera Guild
Member, National Society Daughters of American Revolution (NSDAR) 
Royal Society of Descendants of Charlemagne

References

1917 births
2006 deaths
Academics from Vermont
Arthurian scholars